Sebakor Bay, is a bay on the west of Bomberai Peninsula in northern Province of Papua.

Karas and Semai islands are in the bay.

History 
First recorded sighting by Europeans of Sebakor Bay and Karas Island was by the Spanish expedition of Luís Vaez de Torres on 30 October 1606. Sebakor Bay was charted by the Spaniards as Bahía Bermeja (Reddish Bay in Spanish).

References

Bays of Indonesia
Landforms of Western New Guinea
Landforms of Papua (province)
Islands of Indonesia